Greenbackville is a census-designated place (CDP) 4.5 miles (5 km) south of Stockton, Maryland in Accomack County, Virginia, located just south of the Maryland state line. Per the 2020 census, the population was 173.

History
The town was settled in 1867 and was officially named "Greenbackville" by the United States Postal Service in 1874. Greenbackville and neighboring Franklin City, Virginia grew as a result of the railroad line, the Worcester railroad, completed on April 7, 1876  to transport oysters and other shellfish from Chincoteague to Baltimore, Philadelphia, and New York City.  However, during the course of the 20th century the Depression, the construction of the Chincoteague Causeway, and the nor'easter of 1962 all helped to erode Greenbackville's economic base. The railroad line from the Maryland State line into Franklin City was abandoned in 1956.

The population of Accomack County near Greenbackville grew with the creation of Captains Cove, a planned residential community just west of Greenbackville.

Demographics

2020 census

Note: the US Census treats Hispanic/Latino as an ethnic category. This table excludes Latinos from the racial categories and assigns them to a separate category. Hispanics/Latinos can be of any race.

References

Census-designated places in Accomack County, Virginia
Former municipalities in Virginia
Census-designated places in Virginia